Out of the Afternoon is an album by jazz drummer Roy Haynes, released in the summer of 1962 on Impulse! Records. It features multi-instrumentalist Roland Kirk among the musicians in Haynes' quartet.

Track listing 
 "Moon Ray" (Artie Shaw, Paul Madison, Arthur Quenzer) – 6:41
 "Fly Me to the Moon (In Other Words)" (Bart Howard) – 6:40
 "Raoul" (Haynes) – 6:01
 "Snap Crackle" (Haynes) – 4:11
 "If I Should Lose You" (Leo Robin, Ralph Rainger) – 5:49
 "Long Wharf" (Haynes) – 4:42
 "Some Other Spring" (Arthur Herzog Jr., Irene Kitchings) – 3:39

Personnel 
Roland Kirk - tenor saxophone, manzello, stritch, C flute, nose flute
Tommy Flanagan - piano
Henry Grimes - bass
Roy Haynes - drums

In popular culture
The album's song "Snap Crackle" was featured in the soundtrack of the video game Grand Theft Auto IV, from the fictional in-game jazz music radio station "JNR 108.5 (Jazz Nation Radio)" in which Haynes himself is the DJ of that station.

References

Roy Haynes albums
1962 albums
Impulse! Records albums
Modal jazz albums
Post-bop albums
Albums recorded at Van Gelder Studio
Albums produced by Bob Thiele